Regina Weiss (born  1986) is a Michigan politician.

Early life and education
Weiss was born around 1986 in Chicago, Illinois. In 2009, Weiss earned a bachelor's degree from Valparaiso University in Indiana.

Career
Weiss has worked as a high school English and social studies teacher in the Detroit Public Schools Community District. Weiss has served as a member Oak Park City Council. On November 3, 2020, Weiss was elected to the Michigan House of Representatives seat representing the 27th district. She assumed office on January 1, 2021. Weiss resigned her position as city council member to serve as a state representative.

On November 8, 2022, after redistricting, Weiss was elected to represent the 6th state House district.

Personal life
Weiss is married. Weiss is a Unitarian Universalist.

References

Living people
1980s births
American Unitarian Universalists
Democratic Party members of the Michigan House of Representatives
People from Oak Park, Michigan
Politicians from Chicago
Schoolteachers from Michigan
Valparaiso University alumni
Women city councillors in Michigan
Women state legislators in Michigan
21st-century American women politicians
21st-century American politicians